The Arkansas Union at the University of Arkansas is a Student union central building on the University's campus in Fayetteville, Arkansas.

Uses
Arkansas Union was opened in 1973 to replace the old Student Union. It houses offices and information centers for numerous on- and off-campus organizations, in addition to a student-accessible computer lab and places to eat. The Union is frequented as a meeting place for students.

References

External links
 U of A Union home page
 University of Arkansas

Student Union
1973 establishments in Arkansas
Student activity centers in the United States
University and college buildings completed in 1973